Five ships of the Royal Navy have borne the name HMS Gabriel, after the angel Gabriel. Two others were planned:

 was a ship purchased in 1410 and given away in 1413.
 was a ship launched in 1416. Her fate is unknown.
 was a balinger launched in 1417.
 was a discovery vessel in service in 1575.
 was a Marksman-class destroyer launched in 1915 and sold in 1921.

See also

Royal Navy ship names